Rohne may refer to:

Rohne (Helme), a river of Saxony-Anhalt, Germany, tributary of the Helme
Rohne, Schleife, a district of the municipality Schleife in Saxony, Germany

People with that surname
Marius Røhne (1883–1966), Norwegian landscape architect
Nils A. Røhne (born 1949), Norwegian politician for the Labour Party

See also
Rhone (disambiguation)